Régis Jauffret is a French writer and winner of the Prix Femina, 2005, for Asiles de fous.

Works
Seule au milieu d'elle: roman, Denoël, 1985, 
Les gouttes: pièce en un acte, Denoël, 1985, 
Sur un tableau noir: roman, Gallimard, 1993, 
Histoire d'amour, Gallimard, 1999, 
Clémence Picot, Gallimard, 2000, 
Cet extrême amour, Encre bleue éd., 2000, 
Les jeux de plage: fictions, Gallimard, 2002, 
Promenade, Gallimard, 2003, 
L'enfance est un rêve d'enfant, Gallimard, 2004, ISBN 978-2-84335-212-6
Univers, univers, Gallimard, 2005, 
Asiles de fous, Gallimard, 2005, 
Microfictions, Gallimard, 2007, 
Lacrimosa: roman, Gallimard, 2008, ISBN 978-2-07-012204-2
Ce que c'est que l'amour: et autres microfictions, Gallimard, 2009, 
Stricte intimité, Editions Gallimard, 2009, 
Sévère, Seuil, 2010, 
Tibère et Marjorie, Le Seuil, 2010, 
Claustria (Le Seuil, collection « Cadre rouge »), 2012, 
La Ballade de Rikers Island (Le Seuil, collection « Cadre rouge »), 2014, 
Cannibales (Le Seuil, collection « Cadre rouge »), 2016, 
Papa (Le Seuil, collection « Cadre rouge »), 2020, 
Le dernier bain de Gustave Flaubert (Le Seuil, collection « Cadre rouge »), 2021, ISBN 978-2-02-145366-9

References

20th-century French novelists
21st-century French novelists
Prix Femina winners
Prix Décembre winners
French male novelists
Writers from Marseille
1955 births
Living people
20th-century French male writers
21st-century French male writers